Raghavendra Raja Rao, known by his stage name Sean Roldan is an Indian musician who has worked on Carnatic music, independent music, and film scores for the Tamil film industry. He rose to fame after gaining critical acclaim for his work in Balaji Mohan's Tamil-Malayalam bilingual Vaayai Moodi Pesavum / Samsaaram Aarogyathinu Haanikaram (2014).

Early life
Roldan was born as Raghavendra Raja Rao to the renowned mridangam player Srimushnam V. Raja Rao and Padma, the daughter of novelist Sandilyan. He is married to Lalitha Sudha, a playback singer who works in the Indian film industry, primarily for films composed by him. He was drawn into film music by A.R. Rahman's debut album Roja.

Career
Rao began a career in music composing and working on Carnatic tracks before venturing into independent Tamil music with his band Sean Roldan & Friends. Roldan was recommended by film producer C. V. Kumar to Varun Manian, the producer of the bilingual film Vaayai Moodi Pesavum / Samsaaram Aarogyathinu Haanikaram, who was looking for a composer after the director's original choice, Anirudh Ravichander, had opted out. He subsequently signed the film and chose to continue to credit himself as Sean Roldan for a career in the Tamil film industry. He produced eight tracks for the film, singing two, while including one inspired by the single track "Mayakkura Poo Vaasam" composed for his band. That same year, he composed music for the films Sathuranga Vettai, Mundasupatti, and Aadama Jaichomada. All soundtracks were well-received. 2015 saw him composing the songs for 144.

In 2016, Roldan composed music for the political satire film Joker. The songs were well-received. 2017 saw him composing music for Pa Paandi, the directorial debut of actor Dhanush. Three more films were released that year featuring Roldan's music: Neruppu Da, Katha Nayagan, and Velaiilla Pattadhari 2, the last of which he collaborated with Dhanush, though this time as a lead actor. Roldan's only film composed in 2018 was Kathiruppor Pattiyal. He composed two films in 2019: Mehandi Circus and Raatchasi.

In 2020, Roldan composed one song from Dharala Prabhu, and in 2021, he composed one song from Kasada Thapara. 2021 also saw him composing the legal drama Jai Bhim in his first collaboration with Suriya. The film, based on a true incident, became the first Indian movie to emerge as the highest user-rated film on IMDb.

Musical style 
Roldan's music draws heavy inspiration from Tamil composer Ilaiyaraaja. His greater aim is to represent Indian music internationally.

Discography

As composer

 The films are listed in order that the music released, regardless of the dates the film released.
 The year next to the titles of the films indicates the release year of the either dubbed or remade version in the named language later than the original version.
 • indicates original language release. Indicates simultaneous makes, if featuring in more languages.

As singer

External links

References

Living people
Tamil musicians
Tamil film score composers
Male film score composers
Musicians from Chennai
1987 births